Richard Butler (c. 1510 – 1568 or later) was an English politician.

He was a fruit and cloth merchant in Southampton, made sheriff of the town in 1549–50 and mayor for 1551–52 and 1563–1565. He was elected a Member (MP) of the Parliament of England for Southampton in April 1554.

References

1510 births
Year of death missing
English MPs 1554
Mayors of Southampton